Eupithecia coribalteata is a moth in the family Geometridae. It is found in western China (Qinghai, Gansu).

The wingspan is about 19–21 mm. The forewings are pale grey, with darker dashes on the veins. The hindwings are white with scattered brownish scales.

References

Moths described in 2004
coribalteata
Moths of Asia